Boğatepe Cheese Museum is a museum in Turkey.

The museum is in Boğatepe (former Zavot) village in Kars Province at  close to Turkish state highway . The museum is an abandoned dairy building. It was restored and established as a museum in 2010 .

The village is specialized in cheese production. Kasseri, Gruyère and Chechil are among the many cheese types produced in Boğatepe. However, the European Union standards limit the number of Boğatepe cheese types to three. Accordingly, the number of cheese types produced in dairies decreased to three and the remaining ones face to extinction. The museum was established by the Boğatepe Association Environment and Life  to keep all types of the cheese alive and to present the stages in cheese production to visitors.  United Nations Development Programme (UNDP) also supports the museum.

References

Museums in Turkey
Food museums in Turkey
2010 establishments in Turkey
Museums established in 2010
Buildings and structures in Kars Province
Cheeses with designation of origin protected in the European Union